The Federation of Green Youth and Students (Vihreiden nuorten ja opiskelijoiden liitto ry (ViNO) in Finnish or De gröna unga och studerandenas förbund in Swedish) is a political youth organization in Finland. It is the youth wing of the Green League. The current spokespersons are Brigita Krasniqi and Peppi Seppälä. The youth league has two co-chairpersons.

The organisation is a member organisation in both the Federation of Young European Greens and the Global Young Greens.

References

External links
 ViNO Website

Youth wings of green parties in Europe
Youth wings of political parties in Finland
Student political organizations
Student wings of political parties in Finland